"Booty Bounce" is  a song by American recording artist Dev. It was produced by The Cataracs. Although it was released after, "Booty Bounce" was sampled in Far East Movement's hit single "Like a G6" which reached number one on the US Billboard Hot 100 chart, and sold over three million downloads in the country. It was also featured on Dev's 2011 mixtape Is Hot: The Mixtape.

Music video
The song's music video was directed by Ethan Lader, who also directed Dev's clips for "Bass Down Low" and "In the Dark". The music video features cameo appearances from The Cataracs and T. Mills.

Track listing

Release history

References

2010 singles
Dev (singer) songs
Song recordings produced by the Cataracs
Cherrytree Records singles
2010 songs
Songs written by David Singer-Vine
Songs written by Kshmr
Songs written by Dev (singer)

pt:Booty Bounce